The women's long jump event at the 1978 Commonwealth Games was held on 10 and 11 August at the Commonwealth Stadium in Edmonton, Alberta, Canada.

Medalists

Results

Qualification
Held on 10 August

Final
Held on 11 August

References

Final results (The Canberra Times)
Australian results

Athletics at the 1978 Commonwealth Games
1978